The  was the principal manufacturer of gunpowder, explosives, ammunition and artillery shells for the Imperial Japanese Navy.  It was located in the town of Ōno (now part of the city of Hiratsuka), Kanagawa Prefecture, Japan.

History
The Hiratsuka Naval Ammunitions Arsenal was initially established as a private joint venture enterprise by the foreign firms of Armstrong Whitworth, Nobel, and Vickers in September 1905. All three companies were very active in the supply of weaponry for warships to the early Imperial Japanese Navy. The plant was purchased by the Navy in April 1919 and came under the operational control of the Imperial Japanese Navy Technical Department. Its facilities were greatly expanded from 1939-1941 due to the military buildup before the start of the Pacific War.

The facilities consisted of seven plants:
	Smokeless powder for rockets and artillery
	Nitrocellulose and mixed acids production
	Various acids and hydrogen production
	Design and Engineering, prototype development
	Machine gun ammunition production, solvent recovery
	Naval artillery shells
	Nitroglycerin production

On the night of July 16, 1945, the facilities were attacked by 138 B-29 Superfortress bombers of the USAAF 20th Air Force, 314th Bombardment Wing which dropped a total of 1163 tons of incendiary bombs on the city, destroying most of the city center. Only 5% of the capacity of the Imperial Japanese Navy Ammunition Arsenal was affected, as the bombing was concentrated on Hiratsuka's civilian population center, rather than the military industries located on the outskirts of town.  However, production was almost non-existent by July 1945 due to a lack of raw materials. The plant ceased operation with the surrender of Japan in August 1945 and was officially closed on November 30, 1945. The facilities were occupied by American troops until the end of 1950.

At present, on the site of the former Hiratsuka Naval Ammunitions Arsenal is a large factory operated by Yokohama Rubber Company. This structure was a residence of one of the expatriate British engineers of the original joint venture company and is one of the few structures from the Meiji period remaining in Hiratsuka. The building is available for rental for parties and social functions. It is listed as tangible cultural property.

References

External links
 Yokohama Rubber Memorial Hall of Hiratsuka

Notes

Imperial Japanese Navy
Empire of Japan
Japan–United Kingdom relations
Buildings and structures in Kanagawa Prefecture
Buildings and structures in Japan destroyed during World War II
Arsenals
Japan campaign
Hiratsuka, Kanagawa